Kevin Spadanuda (born 16 January 1997) is a Swiss professional footballer who plays as a midfielder for  club Ajaccio.

Career

In 2017, Spadanuda signed for Swiss eighth tier side FC Schinznach-Bad. Before the second half of 2017–18, he signed for Schöftland in the Swiss fifth tier. In 2018, he signed for Swiss fourth tier club FC Baden. In 2019, Spadanuda signed for Aarau in the Swiss second tier. In 2022, he signed for French Ligue 1 team Ajaccio.

Personal life
Born in Switzerland, Spadanuda is of Italian and Portuguese descent.

References

External links
 

1997 births
Living people
People from Bülach
Swiss people of Italian descent
Swiss men's footballers
Association football midfielders
Swiss 1. Liga (football) players
Swiss Challenge League players
2. Liga Interregional players
Ligue 1 players
FC Aarau players
FC Baden players
AC Ajaccio players
Swiss expatriate footballers
Swiss expatriate sportspeople in France
Expatriate footballers in France